Caecum pulchellum, common name the beautiful caecum, is a species of minute sea snail, a marine gastropod mollusk or micromollusk in the family Caecidae.

Distribution

Description
The maximum recorded shell length is 4.5 mm.

Habitat
Minimum recorded depth is 0.3 m. Maximum recorded depth is 101 m.

References

Caecidae
Gastropods described in 1851